Alessandro D'Avenia (born 2 May 1977) is an Italian writer, teacher and screenwriter.
his book White as milk, red as blood, which led to the film of the same name.

Works 
 White as Milk, Red as Blood 
 Cose che nessuno sa
 Ciò che inferno non è

Essays 
 L'arte di essere fragili: come Leopardi può salvarti la vita, Milano, Mondadori, 2016
 Ogni storia è una storia d’amore, Milano, Mondadori, 2017.

Biography
Alessandro D'Avenia was born in the city of Palermo. At the age of 14, he attended the Liceo Classico “Vittorio Emanuele II” of Palermo where he met Pino Puglisi, his teacher of RE.
After graduation, Alessandro D'Avenia moved to Roma to attend Sapienza University of Rome where he's got a degree in Classic Letters.
In 2010, D'Avenia published his first best-seller book, White as Milk, Red as Blood.

References

External links
 Alessandro D'Avenia website

Italian male writers
1977 births
Living people
Writers from Palermo
Sapienza University of Rome alumni
Italian essayists